Santander is a department of Colombia. Santander inherited the name of one of the nine original states of the United States of Colombia. It is located in the central northern part of the country, borders the Magdalena River to the east, Boyacá to the south and southeast, the Norte de Santander Department to the northeast, the Cesar Department to the north, the Bolivar and Antioquia Departments to the west. Its capital is the city of Bucaramanga.

History

Pre-Columbian era 
Prior to the arrival of the Spaniards, the territory now known as Santander was inhabited by Amerindian ethnic groups: Muisca, Chitareros, Laches, Yariguí, Opón, Carare and Guanes.

Their political and social structure was based on cacicazgos, a federation of tribes led by a cacique, with different social classes. Their main activity was planting maize, beans, yuca, arracacha, cotton, agave, tobacco, tomato, pineapple, guava, among others. Their agricultural skills were sufficiently developed to take advantage of the different mountainous terrains. The Guanes utilized terraces and an artificial system of irrigation. They had a knowledge of arts and crafts based on ovens to produce ceramics. They had cotton to make clothing and accessories such as hats and bags.

Colonization 
Spanish conqueror Antonio de Lebrija led the first expedition through the area in 1529. The area was later invaded c. 1532 by German Ambrosius Ehinger in a quest to find El Dorado. This disrupted or destroyed many of the Amerindian villages. Some ethnic groups like the Yariguíes, Opones, and Carares fought the conquerors until they became extinct. Explorer Gonzalo Jiménez de Quesada later went to the area in an effort to appease the tribes. The colonization process in the area was started by Martín Galeano who founded the village of Vélez on July 3, 1539 and Pedro de Ursúa and Ortún Velázquez de Velasco founded the village of Pamplona (now part of the Norte de Santander Department) in 1549.

Once the Amerindian tribes were dominated, the Spanish organized the territory based on Cabildos (councils) to maintain the dominance and administer justice in the conquered territory. Amerindians were assimilated and subject to the encomienda regime to work in agriculture, manufacturing goods, and mines. These two villages functioned as centers for the Cabildos' territories. In 1636 the Cabildo of Vélez was transferred to a new jurisdiction centered on the village of Girón, with an area which went from the Sogamoso River, Río del Oro to the Magdalena River. The village of San Gil was created in 1689, segregated from the Jurisdiction of Vélez. In 1789 the village of Socorro was also segregated from Vélez and they were all put under the mandate of the Province of Tunja, a subdivision of the Viceroyalty of New Granada. On July 9, 1795 the corregimiento of Vélez – San Gil – Socorro was created due to the unsustainability of the Province of Tunja, and local government was established in the village of Socorro.

Culture 

During the colony and independence war times, people from Santander were specially recognized for their bravery in battle and their policy of "not even a step back". Soldiers from Santander were valued and respected but also difficult to control as they were, in general, more politically aware than people from other regions and therefore prone to question orders and law.
Nowadays, they still retain those features as 'Santandereanos' are normally depicted as cranky and stubborn, not afraid of anything, proud in extreme and speaking their minds without further consideration.
However, people from Santander are also very gentle and kind, have some social conventions of basic etiquette like saying hello first if you are the one arriving and never visiting someone for the first time without a small present. 
In general, they are normally warm and respectful, but try not to make them angry.

Cuisine 

Santander cuisine includes regional specialties and food from the Department's capital city of Bucaramanga and other cities such as Cepita.

The most famous dishes are sancocho, oreada (dried cured beef), mute, egg broth, yellow arepa, masato, guarapo, aguapanela, tamale, and the exotic culona ants.

Goat 
Usually accompanied by pepitoria and yellow arepa, it can be eaten fried, oven-baked, or dried.

Arepa Santandereana 
Flat corn bread. This dish includes chicharron (pork belly-fat) and cooked peeled corn. When possible, the peeled corn is roasted in clay pots, to provide even more flavor.

Mute 
A soup prepared with a variety of ingredients such as red meat, tripe, beef ribs, grains, potatoes, pasta, corn, and spices. Due to the ingredients included, it has a thick consistency.

Pepitoria 
Pepitoria is prepared with the intestines of a goat or lamb. Served with rice, yuca, and potatoes.

Santander tamale 
The tamale is a dish that is eaten in various parts of Colombia, but in Santander it is prepared with peeled corn dough and filled with beef, chicken or pork, chickpeas, onions, and paprika. It is then wrapped in banana leaf giving it a rectangular shape.

Oreada meat 
This is a marinated, salted, sun-dried beef ready to grill. It is a classic dish that can be found in many restaurants as a specialty, served with yucca and chili.

Hormigas Culonas (Big Bum Ants) 
A traditional dish of the Guane indigenous inhabitants of this region. The head, wings, and legs of these giant ants are removed, leaving the body and bum to be fried and seasoned with salt.

Bocadillo Veleño 
Created in the town of Vélez, the Veleño Sandwich is prepared with the pulp of ripe Guava and is wrapped in a bijao leaf, giving it a characteristic flavor. It is sometimes paired with goat cheese.

Broth 
A soup prepared with water, potatoes, toast, coriander, egg, and milk, and enjoyed for breakfast or lunch. There is also a variation called changua or chingua, which is normally prepared only with water, potatoes and coriander.

Obleas wafers 
The wafer is a superfine cookie that is spread with Arequipe (caramel, sweetened milk spread). Over time, other ingredients such as cheese, blackberry, chocolate, etc. have been incorporated.

Masato 
Masato is a fermented drink that is prepared with rice, water, wheat flour, sugar, cloves, and cinnamon. All this together forms a desired drink to accompany fritters or meat patties.

Chorizo from the San José Valley 
12 km from San Gil, on the road that leads to Charalá, you will find a town called Valle de San José. People from this region say this is the best Colombian Chorizo, but people from Santa Rosa de Cabal, in the Coffee Zone, will tell you the same.

Beverages 
 Chicha de maiz, chicha from maize
 Chicha de corozo, chicha from palm nut
 Masato Fermented rice drink.
 Goat milk
 Guarapo
 Aguardiente, alcoholic beverage made from sugarcane (White rum)
 Panela's limonada, lemonade drink with sugar cane.

Artists 
Among the most outstanding and representative artists of the Columbian Santander Department are Segundo Agelvis, Mario Hernández Prada, Carlos Gómez Castro, Martín Quintero, Oscar Rodríguez Naranjo and Pacheco de Suratá.

Notable people 

 Manuela Beltrán (1724-??) a Neogranadine woman who organized a peasant revolt against excess taxation in 1780
 Juan Eloy Valenzuela y Mantilla, (Spanish Wiki) (1756-1834) a Colombian priest and botanist, worked on the Royal Botanical Expedition to New Granada which classified plants and wildlife.
 María Antonia Santos Plata (1782 in Pinchote – 1819 in Socorro, Santander) was a Neogranadine peasant, rebel leader and heroine
 Geo von Lengerke (1827 − 1882) was a German engineer, merchant and landowner.
 Ofelia Uribe de Acosta (1900 in Oiba – 1988 in Bogota) was a Colombian suffragist.
 Oscar Rodríguez Naranjo (1907–2006) a painter from Socorro, Santander Department, Colombia. His works include mainly oil paintings and sculptures
 José de Jesús Pimiento Rodríguez (1919 in Zapatoca - 2019) a Colombian Prelate of the Catholic Church
 Virginia Gutiérrez de Pineda (1921 in El Socorro, Santander - 1999 in Bogotá) was a Colombian anthropologist who pioneered work on Colombian family and medical anthropology
 Reiner Bredemeyer (1929 in Vélez, Santander − 1995) a German composer
 Carlos Ardila Lülle (1930–2021, born in Bucaramanga) a Colombian entrepreneur, founded Organización Ardila Lülle.
 Carlos Prada Sanmiguel (1939−2013) a Colombian Roman Catholic bishop.
 Patricia Ariza (born 1948 in Vélez, Santander) a Colombian poet, playwright and actor

Administrative divisions

Provinces 
The department is subdivided into provinces:

 Metropolitana Province
 North Soto Province
 Comunera Province
 Guanentá Province
 Vélez Province
 García Rovira Province
 Mares Province
 Carare-Opón Province

Municipalities 

 Aguada
 Albania
 Aratoca
 Barbosa
 Barichara
 Barrancabermeja
 Betulia
 Bolívar
 Bucaramanga
 Cabrera
 California
 Capitanejo
 Carcasí
 Cepitá
 Cerrito
 Charalá
 Charta
 Chima
 Chipatá
 Cimitarra
 Concepción
 Confines
 Contratación
 Coromoro
 Curití
 El Carmen
 El Guacamayo
 El Peñón
 El Playón
 Encino
 Enciso
 Florián
 Floridablanca
 Galán
 Gámbita
 Girón
 Guaca
 Guadalupe
 Guapotá
 Guavatá
 Güepsa
 Hato
 Jesús María
 Jordán
 La Belleza
 Landázuri
 La Paz
 Lebrija
 Los Santos
 Macaravita
 Málaga
 Matanza
 Mogotes
 Molagavita
 Ocamonte
 Oiba
 Onzaga
 Palmar
 Palmas del Socorro
 Páramo
 Piedecuesta
 Pinchote
 Puente Nacional
 Puerto Parra
 Puerto Wilches
 Rionegro
 Sabana de Torres
 San Andrés
 San Benito
 San Gil
 San Joaquín
 San José de Miranda
 San Miguel
 Santa Bárbara
 Santa Helena del Opón
 San Vicente de Chucurí
 Simacota
 Socorro
 Suaita
 Sucre
 Suratá
 Tona
 Valle de San José
 Vélez
 Vetas
 Villanueva
 Zapatoca

See also 
 Postage stamps and postal history of Santander

References

External links 

  Government of Santander official website
 Official website of Santander Tourism

 
Departments of Colombia
States and territories established in 1857
1857 establishments in the Republic of New Granada